John de Bradelgehe was the first Archdeacon of Totnes, holding office before 1140.

References

Archdeacons of Totnes